Amiya Nath Bose (20 November 1915 – 27 January 1996) was an Indian politician. He was elected to the Lok Sabha, lower house of the Parliament of India from Arambagh in West Bengal  as a member of the Forward Bloc.

Life
Amiya Nath Bose was the son of the independence activist Sarat Chandra Bose and Vibhabati Devi. His uncle was Subhas Chandra Bose, founder of the All India Forward Bloc. In 1937 he started studying economics at Cambridge University, where he gained a second-class BA, and he was called to the Bar in 1941. He was kept under government surveillance, suspected of radical anti-imperialism. In 1942 he helped found the Committee of Indian Congressmen (CIC), becoming General Secretary. However, his rumoured pro-Axis leanings led to internal conflict in the party. In 1944 he moved to Birmingham to escape the bombings, and helped organize the Indian Political Conference in Birmingham in 1944.

References

External links
 Official biographical sketch in Parliament of India website

1915 births
1996 deaths
India MPs 1967–1970
All India Forward Bloc politicians